Stratocles son of Euthydemos of Diomeia,  was an Athenian politician during the third and fourth centuries BCE. He was a member of a family from the deme of Diomeia.

At some time, he compiled the existing information on knowledge of tactics made in the age of Homer. In 293 B.C., the Macedonian king Demetrius I established a coalition government under oligarchic forms of which Stratocles, aristocratic archon Philippides of Paiania and military leader Olympiordoros took part. Stratocles moved a decree in honour of Philippides of Paiania in 294/3.

References

4th-century BC Athenians